Ian Bunting (born February 10, 1996) is an American football tight end for the Dallas Cowboys of the National Football League (NFL). Bunting has also been a member of the Chicago Bears, New York Jets, Indianapolis Colts, Arizona Cardinals, and Seattle Seahawks.

Early life and education
Bunting was born on February 10, 1996, in Hinsdale, Illinois. He attended Hinsdale Central High School, playing football on offense and defense. He recorded a total of 27 pass receptions for 583 yards and four touchdowns on offense, and also made 12 tackles and two sacks on defense. After graduating, he committed to the University of Michigan. He spent his first year as a redshirt, before making five catches as a freshman in 2015. He recorded five catches again in 2016, but just one as a junior in 2017. He appeared in a total of 34 games for the school before transferring to the University of California.

In his lone season at California, Bunting appeared in 13 games, starting four. He made 18 catches for 195 yards in the season. Against Oregon, he made his career-long reception of 45 yards.

Professional career

Chicago Bears
After going unselected in the 2019 NFL Draft, Bunting was signed by the Chicago Bears as an undrafted free agent. He was waived at the final roster cuts on August 31.

New York Jets
Bunting was signed to the practice squad of the New York Jets on September 2, 2019, and was released on September 25.

Indianapolis Colts
On October 8, 2019, Bunting was signed by the Indianapolis Colts to the practice squad. He was signed to a futures contract on December 30. He was released at the final roster cuts on September 1, .

Arizona Cardinals
Bunting was signed by the Arizona Cardinals to a futures contract on January 5, but was waived on August 23.

Seattle Seahawks
On August 26, 2021, after the retirement of Luke Willson, Bunting was signed by the Seattle Seahawks. He was waived on August 31.

Dallas Cowboys
On September 3, 2021, Bunting was signed by the Dallas Cowboys to their practice squad. He was activated from the practice squad to the active roster for their game against the Washington Football Team, and made his NFL debut in the 27–20 win. He signed a reserve/future contract with the Cowboys on January 18, 2022. He was waived/injured on August 15, 2022 and placed on injured reserve.

References

1996 births
Living people
American football tight ends
Players of American football from Illinois
Michigan Wolverines football players
California Golden Bears football players
Chicago Bears players
New York Jets players
Indianapolis Colts players
Arizona Cardinals players
Seattle Seahawks players
Dallas Cowboys players
People from Hinsdale, Illinois